The Vancouver Island marmot (Marmota vancouverensis) naturally occurs only in the high mountains of Vancouver Island, in British Columbia. This particular marmot species is large compared to some other marmots, and most other rodents. Marmots as a group are the largest members of the squirrel family, with weights of adults varying from 3 to 7 kg depending on age and time of year.

Although endemic to Vancouver Island, Marmota vancouverensis now also resides successfully at several captive breeding centres across Canada as well as several sites on Vancouver Island at which local extinction was observed during the 1990s. This is the result of an ongoing recovery program designed to prevent extinction and restore self-sustaining wild populations of this unique Canadian species. Due to the efforts of the recovery program, the marmot count in the wild increased from fewer than 30 wild marmots in 2003, to an estimated 250–300 in 2015.

Description 

The Vancouver Island marmot is typical of alpine-dwelling marmots in general form and physiology. However this species can be easily distinguished from other marmots by its rich, chocolate brown fur and contrasting white patches. No other marmot species naturally occurs on Vancouver Island. The Vancouver Island marmot, as its name suggests, is geographically restricted to Vancouver Island, and apparently evolved rapidly since retreat of the Cordilleran glaciation some 10,000 years before present. Marmota vancouverensis is distinct from other marmot species in terms of morphology, genetics, behaviour, and ecology.

An adult Vancouver Island marmot typically measures 65 to 70 centimetres from the tip of its nose to the tip of its tail. However, weights show tremendous seasonal variation. An adult female that weighs 3 kilograms when she emerges from hibernation in late April can weigh 4.5 to 5.5 kg by the onset of hibernation in late September or October. Adult males can be even larger, reaching weights of over 7.5 kg. In general, marmots lose about one-third of their body mass during the six-and-a-half months in which they hibernate during winter.

Life history, habitat characteristics and population trends 
The marmots on Vancouver Island are exclusively herbivores and burrow dwellers like all marmots. Over 30 varieties of food plants have been observed being consumed by marmots on Vancouver Island, who typically switch from grasses in the early spring to plants like lupines in the late summer.  Marmots hibernate for various amounts of time depending upon site characteristics and annual weather conditions. Wild Vancouver Island marmots hibernate, on average, for about 210 days of the year, generally from late September or early October until late April or early May. They generally hibernate for shorter periods in captivity.

Vancouver Island marmots typically first breed at three or four years of age, although some have been observed to breed as two-year-olds. Marmots breed soon after emergence from hibernation. Gestation is thought to be approximately 30–35 days. Litter sizes average 3-4 pups, and weaned pups generally emerge above ground for the first time in early July.

Systematic marmot surveys have been conducted since 1979, with variable count effort and coverage of the Island. Suitable meadows are rare compared to nearby regions of the British Columbian mainland or the Olympic peninsula of Washington State; habitat scarceness is believed to be the primary reason for the rarity of this marmot species. Most marmots live above 1000 metres elevation in meadows that face south to west. It is believed that populations expanded during the 1980s. Some natural meadows may be kept clear of invading trees by snow-creep and periodic avalanches or fire.

Conservation status 
Causes of marmot population declines are numerous. Over the long term (i.e., periods involving thousands of years), climate changes have caused both increases and declines of open alpine habitat that constitute suitable marmot habitat. Over more recent time scales, population dynamics may have been influenced by short-term weather patterns and systematic changes in the landscape. In particular, forest clearcutting at low elevations likely altered dispersal patterns. Sub-adult marmots typically disperse from the subalpine meadows in which they were born. Dispersal involves traversing lowland conifer forests and valleys to other subalpine meadows. However, clearcutting has provided marmots with new open areas which constitute habitat. Unfortunately, rapid forest regeneration makes such man-made habitats unsuitable over a few years. One study concluded that clearcuts therefore act as a kind of population "sink" in which long-term reproduction and survival rates are reduced to the point of unsustainability One 2005 study concluded the main cause of recent decline to be predation "associated with forestry and altered predator abundance and hunting patterns". This study also revealed seasonal variations in mortality rates, where the probability of death was low during hibernation, and high in August. Major predators upon Vancouver Island marmots include golden eagles (Aquila chrysaetos), cougars (Puma concolor) and wolves (Canis lupus).

The population crash may also be due to the Allee effect, named after zoologist Warder Clyde Allee. Allee proposed that social animals require a critical mass in order to survive, because survival requires group activities such as warning of predators and migration. A decline below that threshold precipates rapid decline. Ecologist Justin Brashares suggests that at least some of the marmot's group behavior is learned, so that the loss of marmot "culture" has caused them to become more solitary, and interact aggressively rather than cooperatively when they do encounter each other.

The endangered Vancouver Island marmot remains one of the world's rarest mammals. In 1997 there were so few numbers of marmots on Vancouver Island that managers took the bold step of capturing some to create a "genetic lifeboat" and therefore create the possibility of restoring wild populations. The first marmots went to Toronto Zoo in 1997, but this initial effort was quickly followed by efforts made by the Calgary Zoo and Mountainview Conservation and Breeding Centre in Langley, BC. 

In 1998 a new model for species recovery was born involving the government, private industry and public donors. A census in late 2003 resulted in a count of only 21 wild marmots known to be present on Vancouver Island. After these findings, marmots were released from captivity in different places to try to get the population back up to a reasonable number.

These marmots are still classified as endangered.  The cumulative captive breeding program has steadily grown, with 130 individuals in captivity (2010) and 442 weaned pups born in captivity since 2000. A number of individuals have been released to Strathcona Provincial Park, Mount Cain, Mount Washington and more southern mountains.

Marmot Recovery Foundation 
The Marmot Recovery Foundation built a dedicated marmot facility on Mt. Washington, Vancouver Island to further facilitate captive breeding and pre release conditioning.  The fundamental idea was to produce marmots in a fashion that would facilitate their eventual return to the wild. From 2003–2010 the Marmot Recovery Foundation and the British Columbia Ministry of Environment have released 308 marmots back into the wild. More releases are expected in the upcoming years to increase the wild population, estimated at 250–300 individuals in 2010, and 350–400 individuals in 2013. The wild population was counted at 250 in 2021. Due to conservation and recovery efforts, the population of Vancouver Island Marmots has increased drastically since 2003 to present day. Nevertheless, Vancouver Island Marmot populations continue to fluctuate due to natural events or increased predation, leading to an inconsistent annual mortality rate.

Related species 
Based on genetic analyses, the closest relatives of the Vancouver Island marmot are the hoary marmot (Marmota caligata) and the Olympic marmot (Marmota olympus). There is some debate, on genetic grounds, about which of the two nearby mainland species is most closely related to the Vancouver Island marmot 
or when marmots first arrived on the island.  
The differences in DNA observed between species is small.  In 2009, Nagorsen and Cardini identified, from museum specimens, substantial physical differences between species that can only be explained by rapid evolution in a relatively isolated island context.

Use as symbol 
 Because of their endangered status, Vancouver Island marmots have become a conservation symbol in British Columbia.
 Mukmuk, "sidekick" to the three official mascots for the 2010 Winter Olympics and Paralympics, is portrayed as a member of the species.
 The Victoria Royals hockey team mascot, "Marty the Marmot", is based on the Vancouver Island marmot, which the team created to represent the importance of the species to the Vancouver Island region. The marmot was also the former mascot of the now defunct Victoria Salmon Kings hockey team.
 Wild marmots: Chopper, Marlu, and Van Isle Violet, Groundhog Day forecast, via the Marmot Recovery Foundation at Nanaimo, Vancouver Island.

References

Further reading
. Species at Risk series, B.C. Ministry of Environment, Victoria, February 1999. 6 pp.
 Champan, Joseph A., and George A. Feldhamer, eds. Wild Mammals of North America. The Johns Hopkins UP, 1982.
  
 Michael, Huchins, ed. "Vancouver Island Marmot." Grzimek's Animal Life Encyclopidia. 16 vols. Gale, 2004.
Thorington, R. W. Jr. and R. S. Hoffman. 2005. Family Sciuridae. Pp. 754–818 in Mammal Species of the World a Taxonomic and Geographic Reference. D. E. Wilson and D. M. Reeder eds. Johns Hopkins University Press, Baltimore.
 Wilson, Don E., and Sue Ruff, eds. The Smithsonian Book of North American Mammals. Washington: Smithsonian Institution, 1999.
 "Vancouver Island Marmot." World Book Encyclopedia. 13th ed. Chicago: World Book Incorporated, 2008.

External links

Marmots
Mammals of Canada
Vancouver Island
Endemic fauna of British Columbia
Mammals described in 1911